"The House That Jack Built" is a song written by Bobby Lance and Fran Robbins. It was originally recorded by Thelma Jones and released on the Barry label earlier in 1968. That version did not make the U.S. charts.

Aretha Franklin released her version of the song in 1968, and this song reached No. 7 on the Billboard Hot 100.

Aretha Franklin recording
Later in 1968, was recorded and performed by Aretha Franklin.  The song reached No. 2 on the U.S. R&B chart and No. 7 on the Billboard Hot 100.

The song's B-side, "I Say a Little Prayer", reached No. 3 on the U.S. R&B chart, No. 10 on the Billboard Hot 100, and No. 4 in the U.K. in 1968.

Charts

Weekly charts

Covers
 In 2012, Christine Anu covered the song on her album, Rewind: The Aretha Franklin Songbook.

References

1968 songs
1968 singles
Aretha Franklin songs
Atlantic Records singles
Soul songs